Putidaredoxin—NAD+ reductase (putidaredoxin reductase, camA (gene)) is an enzyme with systematic name putidaredoxin:NAD+ oxidoreductase. This enzyme catalyses the following chemical reaction

 reduced putidaredoxin + NAD+  oxidized putidaredoxin + NADH + H+

Putidaredoxin—NAD+ reductase requires FAD.

References

External links 
 

EC 1.18.1